Pablo Cuevas won the title, defeating Marco Cecchinato in the final, 6–4, 4–6, 6–2.

Seeds

  Paolo Lorenzi (semifinals)
  Daniel Gimeno Traver (semifinals)
  Filippo Volandri (second round)
  Malek Jaziri (first round)
  Horacio Zeballos (first round)
  Pablo Cuevas (champion)
  Facundo Bagnis (quarterfinals)
  Marco Cecchinato (final)

Draw

Finals

Top half

Bottom half

References
 Main Draw
 Qualifying Draw

XII Venice Challenge Save Cup - Singles
2014 Singles